The Bourne Supremacy is a 2004 action-thriller film featuring Robert Ludlum's Jason Bourne character.  Although it takes the name of the second Bourne novel (1986), its plot is entirely different. The film was directed by Paul Greengrass from a screenplay by Tony Gilroy.  It is the second installment in the Jason Bourne film series. It is preceded by The Bourne Identity (2002) and followed by The Bourne Ultimatum (2007), The Bourne Legacy (2012), and Jason Bourne (2016).

The Bourne Supremacy continues the story of Jason Bourne, a former CIA assassin suffering from psychogenic amnesia. Bourne is portrayed by Matt Damon. The film focuses on his attempt to learn more of his past as he is once more enveloped in a conspiracy involving the CIA and Operation Treadstone. The film also stars Brian Cox as Ward Abbott, Joan Allen as Pamela Landy, and Julia Stiles as Nicky Parsons.

Universal Pictures released the film to theaters in the United States on July 23, 2004, to positive reviews and commercial success, grossing $290 million on a $75 million budget.

Plot
Jason Bourne and Marie Kreutz are living in Goa, India. Bourne, who is still suffering from amnesia, records flashbacks about his life as a CIA assassin in a notebook.

In Berlin, a CIA agent working for Deputy Director Pamela Landy is paying $3 million to an unnamed Russian source for the Neski files, documents on the theft of $20 million seven years prior. The deal is interrupted by Kirill, a Russian Federal Security Service agent who works for oligarch Yuri Gretkov. He kills the agent and source, steals the files and money, and plants fingerprints framing Bourne for the attack.

After finding Bourne's fingerprint, Landy asks Section Chief Ward Abbott about Operation Treadstone, the defunct CIA program to which Bourne belonged. She tells Abbott that the CIA agent who stole the $20 million was named in the Neski files. Some years previously, Russian politician Vladimir Neski was about to identify the thief when he was killed by his wife in a suspected murder-suicide in Berlin. Landy believes that Bourne and Treadstone's late supervisor, Alexander Conklin, were involved and that Bourne killed the Neskis. Abbott and Landy go to Berlin to capture Bourne.

Gretkov directs Kirill to Goa to kill Bourne. Bourne flees with Marie; Kirill follows and kills Marie, unaware that they switched seats in the midst of the chase. Bourne leaves Goa and travels to Naples, where he allows himself to be identified by security. He subdues a Diplomatic Security agent and a Carabinieri guard and copies the SIM card from his cell phone. From the subsequent phone call, he learns about Landy and the frame job.

Bourne goes to Munich to visit Jarda, the only other remaining Treadstone operative. Jarda informs Bourne that Treadstone was shut down after Conklin's death, and attacks him; Bourne strangles Jarda to death, before destroying his home in a gas explosion as agents move in. Bourne follows Landy and Abbott as they meet former Treadstone support technician Nicky Parsons to question her about Bourne. Bourne believes the CIA is hunting him again and calls Landy from a nearby roof. He demands a meet-up with Nicky and indicates to Landy that he can see her in the office.

Bourne kidnaps Nicky in Alexanderplatz and learns from her that Abbott had been Conklin's boss. Bourne spares Nicky after she reveals she knows nothing about the mission. Bourne then visits the hotel where the killing took place and recalls more of his mission—he killed Neski on Conklin's orders, and when Neski's wife showed up, he shot her and made it look like a murder-suicide.

Danny Zorn, Conklin's former assistant, finds inconsistencies with the report of Bourne's involvement with the death of the agent, and explains his theory to Abbott. Abbott kills Zorn to prevent him from informing Landy. Bourne breaks into Abbott's hotel room and records a conversation between him and Gretkov that incriminates them in the theft of the $20 million. When confronted, Abbott admits to Bourne that he stole the money, ordered Kirill to retrieve the files, and had Bourne framed before arranging for him to be silenced in Goa. Abbott expects Bourne to kill him, but Bourne refuses, believing Marie would not want him to kill Abbott, but leaves his gun on the table and leaves. Landy confronts Abbott about her suspicions and he kills himself and later, she finds an envelope containing the tape of Abbott's conversations with Gretkov and Bourne in her hotel room.

Bourne travels to Moscow to find Neski's daughter, Irena. Kirill, tasked once again by Gretkov with killing Bourne, finds and wounds him. Bourne flees in a stolen taxi and Kirill chases him. Bourne forces Kirill's vehicle into a concrete divider, and leaves behind a seriously wounded Kirill, as Gretkov is arrested. Bourne locates Irena and confesses to murdering her parents, apologizing to her as he leaves.

Later in New York, Bourne calls Landy; she thanks him for the tape, reveals to him his original name, David Webb, and his date and place of birth, and asks him to meet her. Bourne, who is watching her afar from a building tells her to get some rest, as he disappears into the crowd.

Cast
 Matt Damon as Jason Bourne: An amnesiac and former assassin of the CIA's Operation Treadstone
 Joan Allen as Pamela Landy: Deputy Director and Task Force Chief, pursues Bourne after her operation goes badly
 Brian Cox as Ward Abbott: CIA Section Chief, who was formerly in charge of Treadstone
 Franka Potente as Marie Helena Kreutz: Bourne's girlfriend
 Julia Stiles as Nicolette "Nicky" Parsons: A former agent who is taken from her post-Treadstone assignment to assist in the search for Bourne
 Karl Urban as Kirill: A Russian Federal Security Service agent and an expert assassin who is working for Gretkov
 Karel Roden as Yuri Gretkov: Kirill's employer
 Gabriel Mann as Danny Zorn: Formerly assigned to Treadstone headquarters, is now on Abbott's staff
 Marton Csokas as Jarda: A Czech former Treadstone operative based out of Munich
 Tomas Arana as Martin Marshall: CIA Director
 Tom Gallop as Tom Cronin: Landy's righthand agent
 Michelle Monaghan as Kim: Landy's number two agent
 Oksana Akinshina as Irena Neski: Daughter of politician Vladimir Neski, whom Bourne killed

Production
There were no plans to make a sequel to The Bourne Identity (2002) when it was conceived.  Matt Damon commented, "When The Bourne Identity came out I said, 'There is very little chance we will do a second film, just because nobody on the team who made the first wants to make another movie if it can't be as good as, or better than, the first one. According to producer Frank Marshall, the plot for the sequel was not only based on the novel The Bourne Supremacy  but also on Bourne's threat in the first film to come after the CIA if it targeted him.  Producer Paul L. Sandberg felt that screenwriter Tony Gilroy's deviating so much from the book was necessary "because so much of the world has changed" since 1986, when the sequel was first published.  Marshall said that Gilroy thought of an idea that Bourne "would go on what amounts to the samurai's journey, this journey of atonement."

The producers replaced Doug Liman, who directed The Bourne Identity.  This was mainly due to the difficulties Liman had with the studio when making the first film, and their unwillingness to work with him again.  British director Paul Greengrass was selected to direct the film after the producers saw Bloody Sunday (2002), Greengrass' depiction of the Bloody Sunday shootings in Northern Ireland, at Gilroy's suggestion.  Producer Patrick Crowley liked Greengrass' "sense of the camera as participatory viewer", a visual style Crowley thought would work well for The Bourne Supremacy. The film was shot in reverse order of its settings: some portions of the car chase and the film's ending were shot in Moscow, then most of the rest of the film was shot in and around Berlin, and the opening scenes in Goa, India were filmed last.

"Two weeks before [the film's] release, [Greengrass] got together with its star, Matt Damon, came up with a new ending and phoned the producers saying the new idea was way better. And it would cost $200,000 and involve pulling Damon from the set of Ocean's Twelve for a re-shoot. Reluctantly the producers agreed—the movie tested 10 points higher with the new ending".

Reception

Box office
The Bourne Supremacy brought in over $52,521,865 on its opening weekend, putting it at No. 1 for the weekend box office (July 23–25, 2004). The film went to gross over $176,241,941 (61.1%) in North America, with the international release being $112,258,276 (38.9%) resulting in a complete total of $288,500,217 worldwide.

Critical response

On Rotten Tomatoes the film has an approval rating of 82% based on 197 reviews, with an average rating of 7.20/10. The site's critics consensus called the film: "A well-made sequel that delivers the thrills." On Metacritic, it has a weighted average score of 73 out of 100 based on 39 critics, indicating "generally favorable reviews". Audiences polled by CinemaScore gave the film an average grade of "A−" on an A+ to F scale.

Roger Ebert of the Chicago Sun-Times gave the film 3 out of 4, and wrote: "That the director, Paul Greengrass, treats the material with gravity and uses good actors in well-written supporting roles elevates the movie above its genre, but not quite out of it."

Accolades

At the 2005 Taurus World Stunt Awards, veteran Russian stunt coordinator Viktor Ivanov and Scottish stunt driver Gillie McKenzie won the "Best Vehicle" award for their driving in the Moscow car chase scene. Dan Bradley, the film's second unit director won the overall award for stunt coordinator. The film ranks 454th on Empire magazine's 2008 list of the 500 greatest movies of all time.

Soundtrack

See also
 List of films featuring surveillance

References

External links

 
 

2004 films
2004 action thriller films
2000s spy thriller films
American action thriller films
American sequel films
American spy thriller films
Babelsberg Studio films
Bourne (film series)
Films about the Federal Security Service
American films about revenge
2000s English-language films
English-language German films
Films directed by Paul Greengrass
Films produced by Frank Marshall
Films scored by John Powell
Films with screenplays by Tony Gilroy
Films set in 2004
Films set in 2005
Films set in Berlin
Films set in Germany
Films set in India
Films set in Italy
Films set in Moscow
Films set in Munich
Films set in Naples
Films set in New York City
Films set in Russia
Films set in the Netherlands
Films shot in Goa
Films shot in Italy
Films shot in Moscow
Films shot in Russia
Films about United States Army Special Forces
German action thriller films
German sequel films
The Kennedy/Marshall Company films
Universal Pictures films
Films shot in India
2000s American films
2000s German films